Morgan Anthony Gibbs-White (born 27 January 2000) is an English professional footballer who plays as a midfielder for Premier League club Nottingham Forest. He has represented England at under-16 through under-21 level.

Gibbs-White began his career with Wolverhampton Wanderers, making his début in 2017, making almost 100 appearances for the club. After a short loan at Swansea City, he came to prominence during a loan at Sheffield United, earning himself a club record transfer to newly promoted Nottingham Forest in 2022.

Club career

Wolverhampton Wanderers
Gibbs-White joined Wolverhampton Wanderers aged 8 and has played for the club's academy at all age groups. He made his first team debut, aged 16, as a 62nd-minute substitute for Joe Mason in a 2–0 win over Premier League side Stoke City in the FA Cup 3rd round on 7 January 2017. He made his first league appearance on 14 February 2017 in a 1–0 home defeat in the EFL Championship against Wigan Athletic.

In January 2018, it was announced that Gibbs-White had signed a contract that would keep him at the club until summer 2022. He made his first Premier League appearance in the opening home match of the 2018–19 season against Everton as a late substitute. He also came on as a substitute in the home match against Tottenham Hotspur on 4 November 2018; despite the team losing 3–2, his performance received particular praise.

The midfielder got his first start in the Premier League in the home game against Chelsea on 5 December 2018, in which he provided the assist for Wolves' first goal by Raúl Jiménez in a 2–1 win. On 15 August 2019 he scored his first goal for Wolves, on his 57th senior appearance for the club, in a 4–0 second leg win against the Armenian team FC Pyunik in a Europa League qualifier.

During the COVID-19 pandemic, Gibbs-White was disciplined by Wolves for having breached government rules by attending a party in London in May 2020.

On 25 August 2020 he signed a new three-year contract with Wolves before moving on loan to Championship side Swansea City for the 2020–21 season. He scored his first goal for Swansea in a 1–0 win against Preston North End on 12 September. Gibbs-White fractured his foot in Swansea's home game against Millwall on 3 October, leading to him missing three months of the season. He did not make another appearance for Swansea after the Millwall game until coming on as an 85th minute substitute in the 2–1 home win over Watford on 2 January 2021.

Gibbs-White was recalled from his loan at Swansea City by Wolves on 6 January 2021. He scored his first-ever Premier League goal (in his 41st appearance in the competition) on 9 May, a late winner in a 2–1 victory over Brighton & Hove Albion at Molineux.

Gibbs-White joined Sheffield United on loan for the 2021–22 season on 31 August 2021, having made 3 appearances for Wolves in the early weeks of the season (including a goal in the EFL Cup against Nottingham Forest). He scored on his debut for Sheffield United against Peterborough United on 11 September 2021 in a 6–2 win, and again in his second Sheffield United appearance (against  Preston North End) on 14 September, a game which ended as a 2–2 draw.

Nottingham Forest
On 19 August 2022, Gibbs-White moved to Nottingham Forest, signing a five-year deal for a reported club record transfer fee of £25 million with another potential £17 million in add-ons. He scored his first goal for the club on 5 November 2022 in the home fixture vs. Brentford.

International career
Gibbs-White was part of the England team that won the 2017 FIFA U-17 World Cup in India. He scored twice in the tournament, against the United States in a 4–1 win in the quarter-finals, and once in the final, which England won 5–2 against Spain. In December 2017, Rhian Brewster revealed in an interview with The Guardian that Gibbs-White was racially abused by a Spanish player during the final with the FA reporting the incident to FIFA.

On 27 May 2019, Gibbs-White was included in England's 23-man squad for the 2019 UEFA European Under-21 Championship in Italy. He made his debut for that age group during the 3–3 draw with Croatia at the San Marino Stadium on 24 June, playing the final 17 minutes in place of James Maddison.

Personal life
Born in England, Gibbs-White is of Jamaican descent. He was born and grew up in Stafford. He attended Sir Graham Balfour School in his hometown and later Thomas Telford School in Telford, Shropshire, where he was coached by Des Lyttle.

Career statistics

Honours
Wolverhampton Wanderers
EFL Championship: 2017–18

England U17
FIFA U-17 World Cup: 2017

individual
Sheffield United Player of the Year: 2021–22
Sheffield United Young Player of the Year: 2021–22

References

External links
Profile at the Nottingham Forest F.C. website

2000 births
Living people
English footballers
England youth international footballers
Wolverhampton Wanderers F.C. players
Swansea City A.F.C. players
Sheffield United F.C. players
Nottingham Forest F.C. players
English Football League players
Premier League players
Sportspeople from Stafford
Association football midfielders
Black British sportspeople
People educated at Sir Graham Balfour School
People educated at Thomas Telford School
English people of Jamaican descent